This is a list of fossiliferous stratigraphic units in the Democratic Republic of the Congo.



See also 
 Lists of fossiliferous stratigraphic units in Africa
 List of fossiliferous stratigraphic units in Angola
 List of fossiliferous stratigraphic units in Zambia
 Geology of the Democratic Republic of the Congo

References

Further reading 
 R. Aoki. 1992. Fossil crocodilians from the late Tertiary strata in the Sinda Basin, eastern Zaire. African Study Monographs 17:67-85
 O. A. Hoeg and M.N. Bose. 1960. The Glossopteris flora of the Belgian Congo, with a note on some fossil plants from the Zambesi [sic] Basin (Mozambique). Annales du Musee Royal du Congo Belge 32:1-99
 A. K. Miller. 1951. Tertiary nautiloids of west-coastal Africa. Annales du Museé du Congo Belge Tervuren, Sciences Géologiques 8:1-88
 P. P. Pavlakis. 1990. Plio-Pleistocene Hippopotamidae from the Upper Semliki. Virginia Museum of Natural History Memoir 1:203-223
 P. Pruvost. 1934. Description d'un insecte fossile des couches de la Lukuga (Kivu). Memoires de l'Institut geologique de l'Universite de Louvain 9(4):1-8
 W. E. Swinton. 1948. A Cretaceous pterosaur from the Belgian Congo. Bulletin de la Société Belge de Géologie, de Paléontologie, et d'Hydrologie 57:234-238

 
Democratic Republic of the Congo
 
Democratic Republic of the Congo geography-related lists
Fossil